Little Veronica (German: Die kleine Veronika) is a 1929 Austrian-German silent film directed by Robert Land and starring Käthe von Nagy, Maly Delschaft and Mizzi Zwerenz.

The film's art direction was by Julius von Borsody.

Cast
  Käthe von Nagy as Veronika - deren Tochter  
 Maly Delschaft as Rosi - ihre Tante  
 Mizzi Zwerenz as Kathi  
 Harry Hardt as Ferdinand  
 Karl Forest as Ein reicher Wiener Hausbesitzer  
 Gustl Werner as Eugen  
 Artur Ranzenhofer as Franz Weber - ein Dorfschreiber  
 Anny Ranzenhofer as Frau Weber - seine Frau  
 Gaby Gilles as Gusti  
 Otto Hartmann as Franzl  
 Anita Muthsam as Mali  
 Lizzi Natzler 
 Otto Schmöle 
 Richard Waldemar

References

Bibliography
 Jennifer M. Kapczynski & Michael D. Richardson. A New History of German Cinema.

External links

1929 films
Films of the Weimar Republic
Films directed by Robert Land
German silent feature films
Austrian silent feature films
German black-and-white films
Austrian black-and-white films